The Cumberland Enginemen, Boilermen and Electrical Workers' Union was a trade union in the United Kingdom. It merged with the Transport and General Workers' Union in 1928.

References

See also
 List of trade unions
 Transport and General Workers' Union
 TGWU amalgamations

Engine operators' trade unions
Defunct trade unions of the United Kingdom
Trade unions disestablished in 1928
Transport and General Workers' Union amalgamations
Trade unions based in Cumbria